Sebastián Salem  (born 8 March 1983) is a Peruvian professional golfer who currently plays on PGA Tour Latinoamérica

Professional career
Salem has played sporadically on PGA Tour Latinoamérica since 2012 and achieved his only professional win to date at the 2012 Lexus Perú Open on the tour.

Professional wins (1)

PGA Tour Latinoamérica wins (1)

References

External links
 
 

Peruvian male golfers
PGA Tour Latinoamérica golfers
Sportspeople from Lima
1983 births
Living people